Brian Edward Louis Finlay (7 November 1927 – 9 March 1982) was a New Zealand rugby union player. Starting out as a mid-field back and progressing to flanker, Finlay represented  at a provincial level. He played just one match for the New Zealand national side, the All Blacks, a test against the touring British Lions at Carisbrook in 1959, in which he played as a flanker.

Finlay died at Auckland on 9 March 1982, and was buried at Kelvin Grove Cemetery in Palmerston North.

References

1927 births
1982 deaths
Burials at Kelvin Grove Cemetery
Manawatu rugby union players
Massey University alumni
New Zealand international rugby union players
New Zealand rugby union players
People educated at St. Patrick's College, Wellington
Rugby union centres
Rugby union flankers
Rugby union players from Cromwell, New Zealand